Vieja melanurus, the quetzal cichlid, redhead cichlid or firehead cichlid, is a species of cichlid that is native to the Lake Petén system, the Grijalva–Usumacinta River basin and other Atlantic river drainages in southern Mexico, Belize and Guatemala, with introduced populations in a few other countries. It typically inhabits slow-moving or standing waters such as rivers, lakes and lagoons; although primarily a freshwater fish, it may occur in slightly brackish habitats. It is popular in the aquarium trade, where often listed under the synonym V. synspila/synspilum. It is almost entirely herbivorous, but may also take small animal prey.

Males grow larger than females and also develop a prominent nuchal hump on their forehead. Adults are quite colourful cichlids with an orange to pinkish-red head, a body often displaying greenish, bluish, pink and golden-orange, and a horizontal black bar (often patchy or mottled) at the base of the tail; the belly and mottling elsewhere on the body can also be black. There are significant individual and geographical variations in the colours; partially, this is related to the clarity of the water at a location. Adults are always robust and high-bodies cichlids, but there are some regional variations depending on habitat.

It has been used in creating new hybridized aquarium cichlids that became popular in Asia in recent years and is probably one of the parents of modern blood parrot cichlids and flowerhorn cichlids.

References

melanurus
Fish of Central America

Taxa named by Albert Günther
Fish described in 1862